The 2016 Heartland Championship, known as the 2016 Mitre 10 Heartland Championship for sponsorship reasons, was the eleventh edition of the Heartland Championship, a rugby union competition involving the twelve amateur rugby unions in New Zealand. The tournament included a round-robin stage in which the twelve teams played eight games each and then the top four advanced to the Meads Cup semifinals, while fifth to eighth advanced to the Lochore Cup semifinals. In both of these knockout stages the top seeds (first and fifth) played at home against the lowest seeds (fourth and eighth), the second highest seeds (second and sixth) played at home against the third highest seeds (third and seventh) and the final had the higher seed play at home against the lower seed.

Law changes
The New Zealand Rugby Union decided to implement new law changes for the Heartland Championship for 2016. These law changes involved a new points scoring system:
 8 pts for a penalty try (no conversion kick required);
 6 pts for a try;
 2 pts for a penalty, conversion or drop goal.

Teams

The 2016 Heartland Championship was contested by the following teams.

Ranfurly Shield challenges

Three Heartland Championship teams, Thames Valley, King Country and Wanganui challenged Waikato for the coveted Ranfurly Shield. Thames Valley last challenged for the Ranfurly Shield in 2014 against Counties Manukau (losing 68–0), whereas both King Country and Wanganui last challenged for it in 2012 against Taranaki (losing 67–16 and 51–7, respectively).

The first challenge came from Thames Valley in June, when the Swamp Foxes succumbed 83–13 to Waikato. In July the holders retained their Shield in a 55-to-nothing victory against King Country. The last Heartland Championship challenge for 2016 saw Waikato defeat Wanganui 32–12 in Cambridge.

Standings

Regular season
The schedule of fixtures was confirmed on 1 March 2016.

Round 1

Round 2

Round 3

Round 4

Round 5

Round 6

Round 7

Round 8

Finals

Semifinals
Meads Cup

Lochore Cup

Finals
Meads Cup

Lochore Cup

See also

2016 Mitre 10 Cup
Heartland Championship
Ranfurly Shield 2010–2019

References

External links
Official website of the Heartland Championship

Heartland Championship
2016 in New Zealand rugby union
Heartland